German submarine U-200 was a Type IXD2 U-boat of Nazi Germany's Kriegsmarine during World War II.

The submarine was laid down on 3 November 1941 at the AG Weser yard at Bremen as yard number 1046, launched on 10 August 1942 and commissioned on 22 December 1942 under the command of Korvettenkapitän Heinrich Schonder. After training with the 4th U-boat Flotilla at Stettin, the boat was transferred to the 12th U-boat Flotilla for front-line service from 1 June 1943.

She was sunk south-west of Iceland by depth charges from a British aircraft.

Design
German Type IXD2 submarines were considerably larger than the original Type IXs. U-200 had a displacement of  when at the surface and  while submerged. She had two shafts and two  propellers.

U-200 was fitted with six  torpedo tubes (four fitted at the bow and two at the stern), 24 torpedoes, one  SK C/32 naval gun, 150 rounds, and a  SK C/30 with 2575 rounds as well as two  C/30 anti-aircraft guns with 8100 rounds. The boat had a complement of fifty-five.

Service history
U-200s first and only operational war patrol began on 12 June 1943. The new submarine departed Kiel and sailed north of the British Isles, through the gap between Iceland and the Faroe Islands and into the Atlantic Ocean. On 24 June 1943 the U-boat was located by the RAF and sunk with all hands in position  by depth charges from a British Consolidated B-24 Liberator of 120 Squadron.

All 68 souls aboard U-200, including seven members of the German 'Brandenburg' special forces, were lost.

References

Bibliography

External links

Ships built in Bremen (state)
German Type IX submarines
U-boats commissioned in 1942
U-boats sunk by British aircraft
U-boats sunk in 1943
World War II submarines of Germany
1942 ships
U-boats sunk by depth charges
Ships lost with all hands
Maritime incidents in June 1943